The Republic of Ancona was a medieval commune and maritime republic notable for its economic development and maritime trade, particularly with the Byzantine Empire and Eastern Mediterranean, although somewhat confined by Venetian supremacy on the sea. It enjoyed excellent relations with the Kingdom of Hungary, was an ally of the Republic of Ragusa, and maintained good relations with the Turks. All these relationships enabled it to serve as central Italy's gateway to the Orient.

Included in the Papal States since 774, Ancona came under the influence of the Holy Roman Empire around 1000, but gradually gained independence to become fully independent with the coming of the communes in the 11th century, under the high jurisdiction of the papal state.

Ancona was an oligarchic republic ruled by six Elders, elected by the three terzieri into which the city was divided: S. Pietro, Porto and Capodimonte.

Maritime relations and warehouses

The  (colonies with warehouses and accommodation buildings) of the Republic of Ancona were continuously active in Constantinople, Alexandria and other Byzantine ports, while the sorting of goods imported by land (especially textiles and spices) fell to the merchants of Lucca and Florence.

In Constantinople there was perhaps the most important , where the Ancona inhabitants had their own church, Santo Stefano; in 1261 they were granted the privilege of having a chapel in the St. Sophia. Other Ancona  were in Syria (in Laiazzo and Laodicea), in Romania (in Constanţa), in Egypt (in Alexandria), in Cyprus (in Famagusta), in Palestine (in San Giovanni d'Acri), in Greece (in Chios), in Asia Minor (in Trebizond). Moving to the west, Ancona warehouses were present in the Adriatic in Ragusa and Segna, in Sicily in Syracuse and Messina, in Spain in Barcelona and Valencia, and in Africa in Tripoli.

Coins

The first reports of Ancona's medieval coinage begin in the 12th century when the independence of the city grew and it began to mint coinage without Imperial or papal oversight. The agontano was the currency used by Republic of Ancona during its golden age. It was a large silver coin of 18–22 mm in diameter and a weight of 2.04–2.42 grams.

Later and less famously Ancona began minting a gold Agnoto coin, also known as the Ancona Ducat. Specimens of this coin have survived from the 15th and 16th centuries, until the cities loss of independence in 1532.

Art
The artistic history of the republic of Ancona has always been influenced by maritime relations with Dalmatia and the Levant.

Its major medieval monuments show a union between Romanesque and Byzantine art. Among the most notable are the Duomo, with a Greek cross and Byzantine sculptures, and the church of Santa Maria di Portonovo.

In the 14th century, Ancona was one of the centers of the so-called Adriatic Renaissance, a movement spread between Dalmatia, Venice and the Marches, characterized by a rediscovery of classical art and a certain continuity with Gothic art. The greatest architect and sculptor of this artistic current was Giorgio da Sebenico; the greatest painter was Carlo Crivelli.

Navigators

The navigator and archaeologist Cyriacus of Ancona, was a restlessly itinerant Italian navigator and humanist who came from a prominent family of merchants. He has been called the Father of Archaeology: "Cyriac of Ancona was the most enterprising and prolific recorder of Greek and Roman antiquities, particularly inscriptions, in the fifteenth century, and the general accuracy of his records entitles him to be called the founding father of modern classical archeology." He was named by his fellow humanists "father of the antiquities", who made his contemporaries aware of the existence of the Parthenon, Delphi, the Pyramids, the Sphinx and other famous ancient monuments believed destroyed.

The navigator Grazioso Benincasa was born in Ancona; he was the best known Italian maritime cartographer of the fifteenth century and the author of several portolan charts of the Mediterranean.

History
After 1000, Ancona became increasingly independent, eventually turning into an important maritime republic, often clashing against the nearby power of Venice. Ancona always had to guard against the designs of both the Holy Roman Empire and the papacy. It never attacked other maritime cities, but was always forced to defend itself. Despite a series of expeditions, trade wars and naval blockades, Venice never succeeded in subduing Ancona.

It was strong enough to push back the forces of the Holy Roman Empire three times; the intention of the Empire was to reassert his authority not only over Ancona, but on all Italian communes: in 1137 the city was besieged by Emperor Lothair II, in 1167 by Emperor Frederick Barbarossa, and in 1174 the Empire tried again. In that year, Christian I, archbishop of Mainz, archchancellor of Barbarossa, allied with Venice, besieged Ancona, but was forced to retreat. The Venetians deployed numerous galleys and the galleon Totus Mundus in the port of Ancona, while imperial troops lay siege from the land. After some months of dramatic resistance, the Anconitans were able to send a small contingent to Emilia-Romagna to ask for help. Troops from Ferrara and Bertinoro arrived to save the city and repelled the imperial troops and the Venetians in battle. One of the protagonists of the siege of 1174 was the widow Stamira, who had great courage by setting fire to the war machines of the besieger with an axe and a torch.

In the struggle between the popes and the Holy Roman emperors that troubled Italy from the 12th century onwards, Ancona sided with the Guelphs.

Originally named  (Latin for 'Anconitan community'), Ancona had an independence de facto: Pope Alexander III (around 1100–1181) declared it a free city within the Church State; Pope Eugene IV confirmed the legal position defined by his predecessor and on September 2, 1443 officially declared it a republic, with the name ; almost simultaneously Ragusa was officially called "republic", confirming the fraternal bond that united the two Adriatic ports.

Unlike other cities of central and northern Italy, Ancona never became a seignory. The Malatesta took the city in 1348 taking advantage of the black death and of a fire that had destroyed many of its important buildings. The Malatesta were ousted in 1383.

In 1532, Ancona definitively lost its freedom and became part of the Papal States under Pope Clement VII; he took possession of it by political means. A symbol of the papal authority was the massive Citadel, used by Clement VII as a Trojan horse, to conquer the city.

Communities in the Republic

Ancona had Greek, Albanian, Dalmatian, Armenian, Turkish and Jewish communities.

Ancona, as well as Venice, became a very important destination for merchants from the Ottoman Empire during the 16th century. The Greeks formed the largest of the communities of foreign merchants. They were refugees from former Byzantine or Venetian territories that were occupied by the Ottomans in the late 15th and 16th centuries. The first Greek community was established in Ancona early in the 16th century. At the opening of the 16th century there were 200 Greek families in Ancona. Most of them came from northwestern Greece, i.e. the Ionian islands and Epirus. In 1514, Dimitri Caloiri of Ioannina obtained reduced custom duties for Greek merchants coming from the towns of Ioannina, Arta and Avlona in Epirus. In 1518 a Jewish merchant of Avlona succeeded in lowering the duties paid in Ancona for all "the Levantine merchants, subjects to the Turk".

In 1531 the Confraternity of the Greeks was established which included Eastern Orthodox and Catholic Greeks. They secured the use of the Church of St. Anna dei Greci and were granted permission to hold services according to the Greek and the Latin rite. The church of St. Anna had existed since the 13th century, initially as "Santa Maria in Porta Cipriana," on ruins of the ancient Greek walls of Ancona.
 
In 1534 a decision by Pope Paul III favoured the activity of merchants of all nationalities and religions from the Levant and allowed them to settle in Ancona with their families. A Venetian travelling through Ancona in 1535 recorded that the city was "full of merchants from every nation and mostly Greeks and Turks." In the second half of the 16th century, the presence of Greek and other merchants from the Ottoman Empire declined after a series of restrictive measures taken by the Italian authorities and the pope.

Disputes between the Eastern Orthodox and Catholic Greeks of the community were frequent and persisted until 1797 when the city was occupied by the French, who closed all the religious confraternities and confiscated the archive of the Greek community. The French would return to the area to reoccupy it in 1805–1806. The church of St. Anna dei Greci was re-opened to services in 1822. In 1835, in the absence of a Greek community in Ancona, it passed to the Latin Church.

Commercial law
The Ancona trade in the Levant was the promoter of the birth of commercial law: the jurist Benvenuto Stracca (Ancona, 1509–1579) published in 1553 the treatise ; it was one of the first, if not the first, legal imprint dealing specifically with commercial law. This treatise focused on merchants and merchant contracts, practices and maritime rights, to which he soon added extensive discussions of bankruptcy, factors and commissions, third party transfers, and insurance. For this reason, Stracca is often considered the father of the commercial law and author of the first Italian treatise on insurance contracts.

Alliance with Ragusa

Commercial competition among Venice, Ancona and Ragusa was very strong because all of them bordered the Adriatic Sea. They fought open battles on more than one occasion. Venice, aware of its major economic and military power, disliked competition from other maritime cities in the Adriatic. Several Adriatic ports were under Venetian rule, but Ancona and Ragusa retained their independence. To avoid succumbing to Venetian rule, these two republics made multiple lasting alliances.

Venice conquered Ragusa in 1205 and held it until 1382 when Ragusa regained de facto freedom, paying tributes first to the Hungarians, and after the Battle of Mohács, to the Ottoman Empire. During this period Ragusa reconfirmed its old alliance with Ancona.

Bibliography
 
 Peter Earle (1969), "The commercial development of Ancona, 1479–1551", Economic History Review, 2nd ser., vol. 22, pp. 28–44
Joachim-Felix Leonhard, Ancona nel Basso Medioevo. La politica estera e commerciale dalla prima crociata al secolo XV Il lavoro editoriale, Ancona 1992 (original edition: Die Seestadt Ancona im Spätmittelalter, Niemeyer Max Verlag GmbH, 1983);

References

Ancona
City-states
History of le Marche
Italian states
Maritime republics
11th century in Italy
12th century in Italy
13th century in Italy
14th century in Italy
15th century in Italy
16th century in Italy